Darko Horvat (born 28 September 1970) is a Croatian politician who served as Minister of Construction, Physical Planning and State Property in the Government of Croatia between 2020 and 2022, when he was arrested by USKOK for abuse of position. He is a member of the Croatian Democratic Union since 1999. His successor is Ivan Paladina.

Early life and education 
Horvat was born on 28 September 1970 in Donja Dubrava near Čakovec, SFR Yugoslavia. He attended elementary school in Čakovec. Horvat graduated from the Faculty of Electrical Engineering and Computing at the University of Maribor.

See also 
 Cabinet of Andrej Plenković I
 Cabinet of Andrej Plenković II

References

1970 births
Living people
Croatian Democratic Union politicians
Economy ministers of Croatia
Representatives in the modern Croatian Parliament
University of Maribor alumni
People from Međimurje County
Government ministers of Croatia
Corruption in Croatia